There have been 49 men and seven women who have been appointed as justices of the High Court of Australia. Together, the judges are alumni of six Australian universities, two universities in the United Kingdom, three in the United States of America and one Barristers' Admission Board.

Australia

University of Sydney 
 Sydney Law School – 20 alumni
 H. V. Evatt
 Edward McTiernan
 Dudley Williams
 Frank Kitto
 Alan Taylor
 Victor Windeyer
 Garfield Barwick
 Cyril Walsh
 Anthony Mason
 Kenneth Jacobs
 Lionel Murphy
 William Deane
 Mary Gaudron
 William Gummow
 Michael Kirby
 Murray Gleeson
 Susan Crennan
 Virginia Bell
 Jacqueline Gleeson
 Jayne Jagot

University of Melbourne
 Melbourne Law School – 14 alumni
 Isaac Isaacs
 H. B. Higgins
 Frank Gavan Duffy
 Hayden Starke
 Owen Dixon
 John Latham
 Wilfred Fullagar
 Douglas Menzies
 Ninian Stephen
 Keith Aickin
 Daryl Dawson – also completed a Master of Laws from Yale Law School
 Kenneth Hayne – also completed a Bachelor of Civil Law from Oxford
 Geoffrey Nettle – also completed a Bachelor of Civil Law from Oxford
 Simon Steward

University of Queensland
 University of Queensland – 6 alumni
 Charles Powers
 William Webb
 Harry Gibbs
 Gerard Brennan
 Ian Callinan
 Patrick Keane  – also completed a Bachelor of Civil Law from Oxford

University of Western Australia
 University of Western Australia – 5 alumni
 Ronald Wilson – also completed a Master of Laws from the University of Pennsylvania
 John Toohey
 Robert French
 Michelle Gordon
 James Edelman – also completed a doctorate from Oxford and a Bachelor of Commerce from Murdoch

Australian National University 
 Australian National University College of Law – 1 alumnus
 Stephen Gageler – also completed a Master of Laws from Harvard

United Kingdom

University of Cambridge
 University of Cambridge – 2 alumni
 Adrian Knox
 Susan Kiefel

University of Oxford 
 University of Oxford – 5 alumni
Dyson Heydon
Patrick Keane 
Geoffrey Nettle 
Kenneth Hayne
James Edelman

United States

Harvard University
Harvard Law School – 1 alumnus
 Stephen Gageler

University of Pennsylvania
University of Pennsylvania – 1 alumnus
Ronald Wilson

Yale University
Yale Law School – 1 alumnus
Daryl Dawson

No formal law school
 New South Wales Legal Profession Admission Board – 2 alumni
 Michael McHugh
 Susan Kiefel – also completed a Master of Laws from Cambridge

See also
 List of universities in Australia
 List of law schools in Australia
 Tertiary education in Australia

 
 
Australian High Court justices